Bazoches-et-Saint-Thibaut is a commune in the Aisne department in Hauts-de-France in northern France. It is the result of the merger, on 1 January 2022, of the communes of Bazoches-sur-Vesles and Saint-Thibaut.

Politics and administration

List of delegated communes

List of mayors

Local culture and heritage

See also
 Communes of the Aisne department
 List of new French communes created in 2022

References

Communes of Aisne
Communes nouvelles of Aisne
Populated places established in 2022
2022 establishments in France